The 1991 NCAA basketball tournament was the 67th season in the Philippine National Collegiate Athletic Association (NCAA). The season opens on August 3 at the Araneta Coliseum and ended on October 16 with the Mapua Cardinals winning back-to-back championships in the Seniors division and won their 5th NCAA crown.

Teams

Seniors' tournament

Elimination round
Format:
Tournament divided into two halves: winners of the two halves dispute the championship in a best-of-3 finals series unless:
A team wins both rounds. In that case, the winning team automatically wins the championship.
A third team has a better cumulative record than both finalists. In that case, the third team has to win in a playoff against the team that won the second round to face the team that won in the first round in a best-of-3 finals series.

First round team standings

Second round team standings

Cumulative standings
No other team had a better cumulative record than the two pennant winners, so playoff for the Finals berth was not played.

Mapua Cardinals wins the second round flag and forces a best-of-three title playoffs with first round winner San Beda College by downing the Red Lions on the last day of the eliminations on October 2.

Finals

Game 1

Mapua had their biggest lead at 96-81 with 3:20 remaining. But the Red Lions' unlikely trio of Reynaldo Dionisio, Cornelio Manucat and last year's junior MVP Vincent Largo put San Beda to within 90-96 in the last 1:43. A triple by Olegario Topacio which beat the shotclock and two free throws by Reuben dela Rosa got the Cardinals off the hook.

Game 2

With reserves Cornelio Manucat, Reynaldo Dionisio, Renato Morano and Jose Ramil Espina thrown into the limelight of championship action, the Red Lions broke away at 91-78 in the last 2:25. A 14-4 Mapua counter triggered by Olegario Topacio and Winchester Lemen put the Cardinals to within 92-95 in the last 45 seconds.

Game 3

Cardinal slotman Benito Cheng beat all rebounders for a follow-up in the final five seconds and awry pass spoiled the Red Lions' last offensive. There was no San Beda timeout and what ensued was a quick inbound to Cornelio Manucat who dribbled toward  the centerline before issuing a breast-pass to a streaking Reynaldo Dionisio. The pass was too strong and a bit high, lipping Dionisio's fingertips before going out of bounds with a stream of Mapua supporters entering the court at the buzzer.

See also
UAAP Season 54 men's basketball tournament

References

67
1991 in Philippine basketball